George Petruț Gavrilaș  (born 15 December 1990) is a Romanian footballer who plays as a goalkeeper for Metaloglobus București. Before being transferred to Astra Ploiești, Gavrilaș was being scouted by AC Milan.

Honours

Astra Giurgiu
 Liga I (1): 2015–16
 Cupa României (1): 2013–14
 Supercupa României (2): 2014, 2016

FC Voluntari
 Cupa României (1): 2016–17
 Supercupa României (1): 2017

References

External links
 
 

1990 births
Living people
People from Sighetu Marmației
Romanian footballers
Association football goalkeepers
Liga I players
Liga II players
CS Minaur Baia Mare (football) players
AFC Dacia Unirea Brăila players
FC Astra Giurgiu players
FC Voluntari players
ASC Daco-Getica București players
FC Metaloglobus București players
FC Unirea Dej players